Mbulelo Oldjohn Mabizela (born 16 September 1980) is a South African former professional footballer who played as a defender and sometimes as a midfielder.

Club career

Early professional career
Mabizela was born in Pietermaritzburg, KwaZulu-Natal. He started his career using his mother's surname Oldjohn, but later preferred to be known as Mabizela, the surname of his father, Dumisani, who also played soccer for AmaZulu. As the youngest player to captain the South Africa national team, his surname Oldjohn was often referred as a nickname.

Mabizela began his senior club career with Maritzburg City in the National First Division, later joining Orlando Pirates.

Europe
In August 2003 Mabizela joined Tottenham Hotspur after inspiring Pirates to a 2–1 win over Tottenham when the London club made a short tour of South Africa before the start of the 2003–04 season. He scored his only goal for the club on his debut after coming on as a substitute in a league match against Leicester City in October 2003. In October 2004, he had his contract cancelled by Tottenham Hotspur and was released by mutual agreement following several disciplinary infractions, including missing training sessions. He made only nine appearances in total for the club, scoring one goal.

Mabizela was invited to train with London-based club Fulham after his release, but was rejected by the club supposedly after being considered overweight. He joined Norwegian club Vålerenga in March 2005, six months after being without club and spent a season at the Norwegian club where he played infrequently and won the national title.

Return to South Africa
In August 2006 Mabizela signed for South African team Mamelodi Sundowns  . On December, he received a six-month ban from the game for drug offences. Following a number of disciplinary problems including a car accident and arrest for drunken driving in late 2008, he was made available for transfer and found a new home in January 2009 when he signed a three-year contract with Platinum Stars. He was later acquitted of the drunk driving charges.

Mabizela had his contract terminated in July 2009 after failing to show up for training, but was given a second chance by the new coach Steve Komphela. He signed new deal in August and, during the process, he refused to play after disagreeing on a clause in his contract.

On 7 June 2010, Mabizela was voted the Platinum Stars man of the match in the Stars' 3–0 defeat to the England international team in their final warm-up game before the 2010 World Cup in South Africa. Before the match he gave an interview in which he said he was looking forward to meeting Ledley King and Jermain Defoe again, two England players he played alongside at Tottenham Hotspur. Also he talked about how he is steadily overcoming his personal problems, "I had a good start at Spurs but it was too short and that's something I'll always look back on with regret", said Mabizela. "I've made a lot of mistakes in my personal life, things I'd rather not elaborate upon, and that was the reason I had to leave Spurs". "When I came back to South Africa I went for help, I got help and I'm still being helped. I wouldn't say I'm okay but I feel I'm going forward now. Platinum Stars have really helped me and at the moment I feel that I've really moved on. I am ready to move on with my career, even possibly back to Europe and I'd like to play for the Bafana Bafana international team again".

In May 2011 Platinum Stars announced a major clear-out of a number of players including Mabizela, who then became a free agent. On 11 August 2011, after being linked with a number of clubs including Orlando Pirates and Golden Arrows, Mabizela signed a two-year deal for Bidvest Wits on a free transfer and was given the squad number 3. In May 2012, Bidvest Wits held their end of season awards evening and Mabizela was named the club's Player of the Year at the function which was held at the Southern Sun in Monte Casino. It was reported that Mabizela had been an influential and outstanding figure at the club since joining at the beginning of that season.

During the 2012–13 season, Mabizela became very much unsettled at the Clever Boys during the first half of the season and requested to be released from his contract after the club made the following statement to the press in December 2012. "We have advised Mbulelo Mabizela and his agent that he is not part of our plans for the remaining duration of his contract with us and that we will consider offers from other clubs for his services during the forthcoming January transfer window period." On 20 January 2013, he joined Chippa United on an 18-month contract until June 2014 and was reported to say he hoped to help save the Cape Town teams young side from relegation by the end of the season. He was released at the end of the 2012–13 season after the team was relegated.

In October 2013 Mabizela began training with Mpumalanga Black Aces. Despite rumours linking him to former club Orlando Pirates, He signed a deal with Black Aces till the end of the 2013–14 season. In June 2014, the Black Aces spokesman Gordon Masondo confirmed that Mabizela's contract had been renewed until 30 June 2016. However, he was frozen out of the squad in October after falling out with manager Clive Barker, including a bust-up with a veteran coach and was released in December based on the recommendations of a disciplinary enquiry following his misbehavior.

On 26 January 2015, Mabizela signed for AmaZulu, which was at the bottom of the table, on a short-term contract. The player claimed that "the relegation challenge appealed to him", but failed to avoid relegation and was subsequently released.

National First Division (NFD)
Despite his negative experience with Clive Barker at Black Aces, Mabizela was requested to be signed by the former manager in October 2015, then at Maritzburg United. However, according to a former backroom employee at the club, the player would never sign for his hometown side after previous statements regarding the player, alcohol and banned substances. In the same month, he signed for NFD side Royal Eagles. In March 2016 he was dismissed for misconduct by the club.

International career
Mabizela was first called to the South Africa national team by Carlos Queiroz in November 2001 after only 3 months of PSL experience as a late replacement to Nasief Morris for a friendly match against Egypt, against who he made his debut as a right-back. He had a poor performance as a right-back during the 2002 Africa Cup of Nations and was left out of the 2002 FIFA World Cup squad coached by Jomo Sono. He was recalled in September 2002 by Ephraim Mashaba as a centre-back, earning back his place in the international squad and in June 2003 he was the youngest captain ever for the national team with the age of 22.

He scored a brace against Cape Verde during the 2006 FIFA World Cup qualification.

His last match for the national team was in 2008 against Nigeria during the 2010 FIFA World Cup and Africa Cup of Nations qualification. He was dropped from the national squad after going AWOL from the national squad in October 2008 before a match against Malawi.

Mabizela went back to the headlines in January 2010 after claiming to be "better" than other defender that were in the national side, a view that was shared by commentators and fans. However, manager Carlos Alberto Parreira was unmoved by the comments and stressed that the behaviour of the players was part of the decision of the selection. He later wrote a letter of apology requesting to be given another chance but was never called to the national side again.

Coaching career
In 2018 Mabizela obtained his Safa coaching D-licence qualification and was coaching at the Local Football Association in KwaZulu-Natal.

Career statistics
Scores and results list South Africa's goal tally first, score column indicates score after each Mabizela goal.

Honours
Orlando Pirates
 South African Premier Division: 2002–03

See also
List of sportspeople sanctioned for doping offences

References

External links
 Voetbal International

1980 births
Living people
Sportspeople from Pietermaritzburg
South African soccer players
Association football midfielders
Association football defenders
Association football utility players
South Africa international soccer players
2002 African Cup of Nations players
2004 African Cup of Nations players
2006 Africa Cup of Nations players
South African Premier Division players
Premier League players
Eliteserien players
Mamelodi Sundowns F.C. players
Orlando Pirates F.C. players
Tottenham Hotspur F.C. players
Vålerenga Fotball players
Platinum Stars F.C. players
Bidvest Wits F.C. players
Chippa United F.C. players
Mpumalanga Black Aces F.C. players
AmaZulu F.C. players
Royal Eagles F.C. players
Doping cases in association football
South African sportspeople in doping cases
South African expatriate soccer players
South African expatriate sportspeople in England
Expatriate footballers in England
South African expatriate sportspeople in Norway
Expatriate footballers in Norway